Esher Commons is a  biological Site of Special Scientific Interest south-west of Esher in Surrey. It includes Esher Common, Fairmile Common, West End Common and Oxshott Heath. Esher Common and West End Common are Local Nature Reserves.

Geology and terrain
The geology of the Commons consists of the damp clay soils of the Claygate Beds and acidic soils of the Bagshot Beds and Plateau Gravels with peat on top. The terrain is lowland heath, predominantly covered by woodland, including both deciduous and coniferous trees, notably: oak; beech; silver birch; birch; and Scots Pine in various stages of maturity. There is also grassland, and areas of marsh, bog and open water which provide a rich variety of habitats to support many species of plant and animal life.

The Common was not always wooded, and much of the area was formerly open heathland used as common grazing land. It had not been grazed for many years and much of the area is now secondary woodland, including conifer plantations from the 1950s. Grazing trials began on a small area of Esher Commons in 2015. In the first year 15 goats were introduced to a 2.5ha area of heath for a period of six months. Esher Commons Site of Special Scientific Interest covers a large part of Arbrook, Esher, Oxshott, West End and Fairmile Commons and the Ledges.  Arbrook Common is the easternmost, named after the Arbrook, at other points and sources known as the 'Rythe'.  Otherwise much of the remainder of the commons is a subterranean aquifer. A programme to fell tracts of secondary woodland has led to various public protests.
In spite of the SSSI designation, the A3 Esher bypass was built through the middle of Esher Common in 1974. The Ledges were added to West End Common, and an area including Middle Pond became part of Esher Common.

Esher Common

Esher Common is a  It contains several ponds and lakes, the largest of which is Black Pond. This was once used as a water supply for the nearby Claremont Landscape Garden now owned and managed by the National Trust. The main piece of high ground is Round Hill, close to Copsem Lane.

There are parking facilities on the A307 (old Portsmouth Road) and the A244 (Copsem Lane).

West End Common

West End Common includes The Ledges, which is a bank of high ground alongside the River Mole.

The common shares the parking facilities on the A307, and can also be accessed from the direction of West End.

References

External links
English Nature SSSI
Esher Residents site

Forests and woodlands of Surrey
Borough of Elmbridge
Parks and open spaces in Surrey
Sites of Special Scientific Interest in Surrey
Local Nature Reserves in Surrey